Ben Nash Quansah (born 20 July 1996) is a Ghanaian professional footballer who plays as a defender.

Career

Ghana
Ben started his career with Dreams FC in Ghana.

Kosovo
After a successful season, Kosova team FC Prishtina signed him on loan.

Kosovo league club KF Flamurtari signed Ben for a season where he played more than 25 games in the season.

India
In July 2021, Ben signed with Kolkata League club Railway FC. Railways finished that season as runner up and Ben performance has gained interest from I-League clubs.

In December 2021, NEROCA FC signed Ben for 2021-22 season. On 3 March 2022, Ben made his debut in I-League against former Champions Gokulam Kerala.

References

1996 births
Ghanaian expatriate footballers
Living people
Ghana Premier League players
Expatriate footballers in India
NEROCA FC players
FC Prishtina players
KF Flamurtari players
Football Superleague of Kosovo players
Ghanaian footballers